Mister Rock and Roll is a 1957 American musical film directed by Charles S. Dubin and written by James Blumgarten.

The film stars Alan Freed, Teddy Randazzo, Lois O'Brien, Rocky Graziano, Jay Barney, Al Fisher and Lou Marks.

The film was released on October 16, 1957, by Paramount Pictures.

Plot

Cast 
Alan Freed as himself
Teddy Randazzo as himself
Lois O'Brien as Carole Hendricks
Rocky Graziano as himself
Jay Barney as Joe Prentiss
Al Fisher as Al
Lou Marks as Lou
Leo Wirtz as Earl George
Ralph Stantley as Station Representative
Lionel Hampton as himself
Ferlin Husky as himself
Frankie Lymon as himself
Little Richard as himself
Brook Benton as himself
Chuck Berry as himself
Clyde McPhatter as himself
LaVern Baker as herself
Shaye Cogan as herself

References

External links 
 

1957 films
Paramount Pictures films
American musical films
1957 musical films
1950s English-language films
Films directed by Charles S. Dubin
1950s American films